The 33rd Division (33. Division) was a unit of the Prussian/German Army. It was formed on April 1, 1871, as the 30th Division and became the 33rd Division on April 1, 1890, and was headquartered in Metz (now in France).  The division was subordinated in peacetime to the XVI Army Corps (XVI. Armeekorps). The division was disbanded in 1919 during the demobilization of the German Army after World War I.  The division was recruited heavily in densely populated Westphalia, as its primary recruiting and garrison area was Lorraine, whose German population was insufficient to support the division.

Combat chronicle

The division fought on the Western Front in World War I.  It participated in the initial German offensive and the Allied Great Retreat.  In 1916, it fought in the Battle of Verdun.  In 1917, it participated in the Second Battle of the Aisne, also known as the Third Battle of Champagne (and to the Germans, as the Double Battle of Aisne-Champagne).  In 1918, the division fought in the German spring offensive, including the First Battle of the Somme, 1918, also known as the Second Battle of the Somme (after the 1916 battle), and the Battle of St. Quentin.  It then fought in the subsequent Allied counteroffensives, including the Battle of Champagne-Marne and the Meuse-Argonne Offensive. Allied intelligence rated the division as first class and the XVI Army Corps as one of the best in the German Army.

Pre-World War I organization

The organization of the 33rd Division in 1914, shortly before the outbreak of World War I, was as follows:

66. Infanterie-Brigade
Metzer Infanterie-Regiment Nr. 98
1. Lothringisches Infanterie-Regiment Nr. 130
67. Infanterie-Brigade
3. Lothringisches Infanterie-Regiment Nr. 135
5. Lothringisches Infanterie-Regiment Nr. 144
33. Kavallerie-Brigade
Dragoner-Regiment König Karl von Rümanien (1. Hannoversches) Nr. 9
Schleswig-Holsteinisches Dragoner-Regiment Nr. 13
33. Feldartillerie-Brigade
1. Lothringisches Feldartillerie-Regiment Nr. 33
2. Lothringisches Feldartillerie-Regiment Nr. 34 
Landwehr-Inspektion Metz

Order of battle on mobilization

On mobilization in August 1914 at the beginning of World War I, most divisional cavalry, including brigade headquarters, was withdrawn to form cavalry divisions or split up among divisions as reconnaissance units.  Divisions received engineer companies and other support units from their higher headquarters.  The 33rd Division was redesignated the 33rd Infantry Division. Its initial wartime organization was as follows:

66. Infanterie-Brigade
Metzer Infanterie-Regiment Nr. 98
1. Lothringisches Infanterie-Regiment Nr. 130
67. Infanterie-Brigade
3. Lothringisches Infanterie-Regiment Nr. 135
5. Lothringisches Infanterie-Regiment Nr. 144
Jäger-Regiment zu Pferde Nr. 12
33. Feldartillerie-Brigade
1. Lothringisches Feldartillerie-Regiment Nr. 33
2. Lothringisches Feldartillerie-Regiment Nr. 34 
1.Kompanie/1. Lothringisches Pionier-Bataillon Nr. 16

Late World War I organization

Divisions underwent many changes during the war, with regiments moving from division to division, and some being destroyed and rebuilt.  During the war, most divisions became triangular - one infantry brigade with three infantry regiments rather than two infantry brigades of two regiments (a "square division"). An artillery commander replaced the artillery brigade headquarters, the cavalry was further reduced, the engineer contingent was increased, and a divisional signals command was created. The 33rd Infantry Division's order of battle on March 10, 1918, was as follows:

66. Infanterie-Brigade
Metzer Infanterie-Regiment Nr. 98
1. Lothringisches Infanterie-Regiment Nr. 130
3. Lothringisches Infanterie-Regiment Nr. 135
Maschinengewehr-Scharfschützen-Abteilung Nr. 43
4.Eskadron/Jäger-Regiment zu Pferde Nr. 12
Artillerie-Kommandeur 33:
Feldartillerie-Regiment Nr. 283
Fußartillerie-Bataillon Nr. 76
Stab 1. Lothringisches Pionier-Bataillon Nr. 16:
5.Kompanie/1. Lothringisches Pionier-Bataillon Nr. 16
1.Reserve-Kompanie/1. Lothringisches Pionier-Bataillon Nr. 16
Minenwerfer-Kompanie Nr. 33
Divisions-Nachrichten-Kommandeur 33

References
 33. Infanterie-Division  (Chronik 1914/1918) - Der erste Weltkrieg
 Claus von Bredow, bearb., Historische Rang- und Stammliste des deutschen Heeres (1905)
 Hermann Cron et al., Ruhmeshalle unserer alten Armee (Berlin, 1935)
 Hermann Cron, Geschichte des deutschen Heeres im Weltkriege 1914-1918 (Berlin, 1937)
 Günter Wegner, Stellenbesetzung der deutschen Heere 1815-1939. (Biblio Verlag, Osnabrück, 1993), Bd. 1
 Histories of Two Hundred and Fifty-One Divisions of the German Army which Participated in the War (1914-1918), compiled from records of Intelligence section of the General Staff, American Expeditionary Forces, at General Headquarters, Chaumont, France 1919 (1920, online)

Footnotes

Infantry divisions of Germany in World War I
Military units and formations established in 1871
Military units and formations disestablished in 1919